Dobson may refer to:

People
 For a listing of people with the surname "Dobson", see Dobson (surname).

Places
 Dobson High School in Arizona, US
 Dobson, Mississippi, a ghost town in Rankin County, Mississippi, US
 Dobson, North Carolina, US
 Mount Dobson, New Zealand
 Dobson, New Zealand

Things
 Dobson (Litigation Guardian of) v. Dobson, [1999] 2 S.C.R. 753 (Supreme Court of Canada decision))
 Dobson Communications
 Dobson ozone spectrophotometer
 Dobson Pipe Organ Builders, a pipe organ manufacturer based in Iowa
 Dobsonian telescope invented by amateur astronomer John Lowry Dobson
 Dobson unit, a unit of measurement of atmospheric ozone named after British physicist Gordon M. B. Dobson